Senator Prescott may refer to:

Russell Prescott (fl. 2010s), New Hampshire State Senate
Stedman Prescott (1896–1968), Maryland State Senate
William Prescott (physician) (1788–1875), Connecticut State Senate
William Prescott Jr. (1762–1844), Massachusetts State Senate